Otto is an unincorporated community in Macon County, North Carolina, United States. Otto has a post office with ZIP code 28763. Otto has a community development organization which meets regularly in the Otto Community Building. This building is attached to the Otto Fire Station which is run by volunteer firefighters.

References

Unincorporated communities in Macon County, North Carolina
Unincorporated communities in North Carolina